Aglish (Irish: An Eaglais, meaning "the church") is a civil parish in the barony of Muskerry East, twelve miles west of the city of Cork, County Cork, Ireland. 

An Ogham inscription was discovered near Aglish which displays the words MUCOI SOGINI, probably referring to the historic tribe of the Corcu Sogain.

References

Civil parishes of County Cork